The Best and the Brightest (1972) is an account by journalist David Halberstam of the origins of the Vietnam War published by Random House. The focus of the book is on the foreign policy crafted by academics and intellectuals who were in President John F. Kennedy's administration, and the consequences of those policies in Vietnam. The title referred to Kennedy's "whiz kids"—leaders of industry and academia brought into the administration—whom Halberstam characterized as insisting on "brilliant policies that defied common sense" in Vietnam, often against the advice of career U.S. Department of State employees.

Summary
Halberstam's book offers details on how decisions were made in the Kennedy and Johnson administrations that led to the war, focusing on the period from 1960 to 1965 but also covering earlier and later years up until publication.

Factors examined:

The Democratic Party was haunted by claims that it had "lost" China to the Communists, and it did not want to be accused of also losing Vietnam. Thus, the decision to intervene in Vietnam militarily was based on political expediency, the need to win a second term, and not on rationality.
The McCarthy era had rid the government of experts on Vietnam and surrounding countries.
Early studies called for close to one million U.S. troops to defeat the Viet Cong, but it would have been impossible to convince Congress or the U.S. public to deploy so many soldiers.
Declaration of war and excessive use of force, including bombing too close to China or too many U.S. troops, might have triggered the invasion of Chinese ground forces or greater Soviet involvement, which might repair the growing Sino-Soviet rift.
The American military and generals were not prepared for protracted guerrilla warfare.
Some war games implied that a gradual escalation by the United States could be matched by North Vietnam: every year, 200,000 North Vietnamese reached draft age and could be sent down the Ho Chi Minh Trail to replace losses against the U.S.: the U.S. would be "fighting the birthrate".
Use of bombing or ground forces would signal the U.S. commitment to defending South Vietnam and subsequently cause U.S. shame if they withdrew.
President Johnson believed that too much attention given to the war effort would jeopardize his Great Society domestic programs.
The effects of strategic bombing: Most people believed that North Vietnam prized its industrial base so highly it would not risk its destruction by U.S. air power and would negotiate peace after experiencing limited bombing. Others saw that, even during World War II, strategic bombing united the civilian population against the aggressor and did little to hinder industrial output.
After placing a few thousand Americans in harm's way, it became politically easier to send hundreds of thousands with the promise that, given sufficient numbers, they could protect themselves and that to abandon Vietnam would mean the earlier investment in money and blood would be lost.

The book shows that the gradual escalation allowed the Johnson Administration to avoid early negative publicity and criticism from Congress and to avoid a direct war against the Chinese, but it also reduced the likelihood of either victory or withdrawal.

Origin of the title

The title may have come from a line by Percy Bysshe Shelley in his work "To Jane: The Invitation" (1822):

Best and brightest, come away!
 
Shelley's line may have originated from English bishop and hymn writer Reginald Heber in his 1811 work, "Hymns. Epiphany":

Brightest and best of the sons of the morning,
Dawn on our darkness, and lend us thine aid.

A still earlier, and more pertinent, use of the phrase is in the letter of Junius published February 7, 1769, in the Public Advertiser. There Junius uses it mockingly and ironically in reference to King George III's ministers, whose capacities he had disparaged in his first letter the previous month. In response to Sir William Draper's letter defending one of Junius' targets and attacking their anonymous critics, Junius wrote:

To have supported your assertion, you should have proved that the present ministry are unquestionably the best and brightest characters of the kingdom; and that, if the affections of the colonies have been alienated, if Corsica has been shamefully abandoned, if commerce languishes, if public credit is threatened with a new debt, and your own Manilla ransom most dishonourably given up, it has all been owing to the malice of political writers, who will not suffer the best and brightest characters (meaning still the present ministry) to take a single right step, for the honour or interest of the nation.

In the introduction to the 1992 edition, Halberstam stated that he had used the title earlier in an article for Harper's Magazine, and that Mary McCarthy criticized him in a book review for incorrectly referencing the line in the Shelley poem.  Halberstam claimed he had no knowledge of the earlier use of the term in the Heber hymn.  Halberstam also observed regarding the "best and the brightest" phrase, that "...hymn or no, it went into the language, although it is often misused, failing to carry the tone or irony that the original intended." In the book's introduction and a 2001 interview, Halberstam claims that the title came from a line in an article he had written about the Kennedy Administration.

Reception 
The book was highly acclaimed upon release. Victor Saul Navasky, writing in The New York Times, said it was Halberstam's "most important and impressive book", citing its "compelling and persuasively presented thesis." Liaquat Ahamed called it a "great novel," praising Halberstam's "storyteller's talent for capturing people" and ability to write a "compelling narrative." Steve Mariotti called it his "favorite book."

In 2011, Time named it as one of the 100 best English non-fiction books written since 1923.

Legacy 
The New York Times'''s Marc Tracy reported that Donald Trump's chief strategist Steve Bannon was reading the book in February 2017. Tracy drew a parallel between Robert McNamara's and Bannon's lack of experience in national security.

Online availability
 Full text available of the condensed Newsweek 1973 edition. (Internet Archive). . 
 Full text available of the Fawcett Publications 1973 edition at Internet Archive. .
 Full text available of the Penguin Books 1983 edition at Internet Archive. .

 References 

Further reading
Berthelsen, O. (1996). Review: The Best and the Brightest by David Halberstam. Journal of Peace Research, 33(1): 120. 
Brindley, T. A. (1974). Review: The Best and the Brightest. by David Halberstam. The Journal of Asian Studies. 33(2): 340-342. 
Hendrickson, D. C. (1997). Review: The Best and the Brightest by David Halberstam. Foreign Affairs, 76(5): 223. 
Solberg, C. (1973). Review: The Best and the Brightest. by David Halberstam. Political Science Quarterly, 88(2): 276-277. 
Warner, G. (1974). Review: The Best and the Brightest. by David Halberstam. International Affairs'', 50(2): 338-340.

External links
Halberstam interviewed by Ben Bradlee on the influence of The Best and the Brightest, February 13, 2005, C-SPAN

1972 non-fiction books
Books by David Halberstam
Random House books
Vietnam War books